Hexosyltransferases are a type of glycosyltransferase that catalyze the transfer of a hexose.

Examples include:
 glucosyltransferases - transfer glucose
 galactosyltransferases - transfer galactose
 fucosyltransferases - transfer fucose
 glucuronosyltransferase - transfer glucuronic acid

They are classified under EC number 2.4.1.

External links
 

Transferases